Madonna and Child Enthroned with John the Baptist and Mary Magdalene is a 1511-1513 oil on panel painting by Cima da Conegliano. Originally in the monastery church of San Domenico in Parma, it was seized by the French occupiers in 1811 and taken to Paris, remaining there after the Congress of Vienna and still in the collections of the Louvre.

References

Paintings of the Madonna and Child by Cima da Conegliano
Paintings in the Louvre by Italian artists
Paintings depicting John the Baptist
Paintings depicting Mary Magdalene
1510s paintings